Zenevredo is a comune (municipality) in the Province of Pavia in the Italian region Lombardy, located about 50 km southeast of Milan and about 20 km southeast of Pavia. As of 31 December 2004, it had a population of 459 and an area of 5.3 km².

Zenevredo borders the following municipalities: Arena Po, Bosnasco, Montù Beccaria, Stradella.

Notable Zenevredesi
People born or based in Zenevredo include:
Carlo Dossi (1849–1910), writer and archaeologist.

Demographic evolution

References

Cities and towns in Lombardy